Voices & Dreams is a live album by guitarist Raymond Boni and multi-instrumentalist Joe McPhee recorded in France in 2000 and first released on the French Emouvance label.

Reception

Allmusic reviewer François Couture states "Recommended, especially to those who prefer their free jazz tempered".

Track listing 
All compositions by Joe McPhee
 "Voices I" - 7:12
 "Dream I" - 10:00
 "Voices II" - 12:28
 "Dream II" - 6:47
 "Voices III" - 11:10
 "Dream III" - 8:20
 "Voices IV" -	11:03

Personnel 
Joe McPhee - tenor saxophone, alto saxophone, pocket trumpet
Raymond Boni - electric guitar

References 

 

Joe McPhee live albums
2001 live albums